"Weightless" is a pop song by Scottish group Wet Wet Wet. It is the second single lifted from their comeback album, Timeless. Released on 4 February 2008, it reached number 10 on the UK Singles Chart, becoming their first single to chart inside the UK top 10 since 1997. However, the following week it fell to number 96, making it the first-ever top 10 hit to spend just one week in the UK top 75. In Scotland, the song debuted at number one, becoming the band's second single to do so after "Love Is All Around" in 1995. The next week, it did not make as big as a fall as it did on the UK Singles Chart, dropping to number 29. It spent three more weeks on the chart before leaving.

Track listings
Standard CD single 1
 Weightless (Single Mix)
 Beautiful Girl

Standard CD single 2
 Weightless (Single Mix)
 Give It All Away
 Stay

DVD Single
 Weightless (Single Mix)
 Weightless (5.1 Remix)
 Weightless promo video
 Too Many People promo video
 Exclusive video footage

Charts

References

External links
Official Website
Townsend Records

2008 singles
Wet Wet Wet songs
2007 songs
Songs written by Marti Pellow
Songs written by Graeme Clark (musician)
Songs written by Neil Mitchell (musician)
Number-one singles in Scotland